The 1959–60 Iowa State Cyclones men's basketball team represented Iowa State University during the 1959–60 NCAA Division I men's basketball season. The Cyclones were coached by Glen Anderson, who was in his first season with the Cyclones. They played their home games at the Iowa State Armory in Ames, Iowa.

They finished the season 15–9, 7–7 in Big Eight play to finish in fourth place. They were Big Eight Holiday Tournament champions, defeating Kansas State, Colorado and Kansas in the December tournament.

Roster

Schedule and results 

|-
!colspan=6 style=""|Regular Season

|-

References 

Iowa State Cyclones men's basketball seasons
Iowa State
Iowa State Cyc
Iowa State Cyc